Jean Lee may refer to:
 Jean Lee (aircraftwoman) (born 1924), Canadian aircraftwoman
 Jean Lee (murderer) (1919–1951), Australian murderer, and the last woman to be hanged in Australia
 Jean Lee (archer) (1925–2010), American archer
 Jean H. Lee, Korean-American journalist

See also 
 Jeannette Lee, British music record executive
 Jeannette H. Lee, Korean–American entrepreneur
 Jeanette Lee, American pool player